Adejeania biornata is a species of parasitic fly in the family Tachinidae. It is found in South America.

References

Further reading

 
 

Adejeania
Articles created by Qbugbot
Insects described in 1947